Zophodia substituta is a species of snout moth in the genus Zophodia. It was described by Carl Heinrich in 1939. It is found in Peru.

The wingspan is about 36 mm. The forewings are light brown and the hindwings are white with a smoky suffusion.

The larvae feed on Cylindropuntia and possibly Echinopsis species. They feed in the stem of their host plant. They are solitary feeders in the terminal segments of the host plant, where they hollow out a large cell. The larvae are green blue.

References

Moths described in 1939
Phycitini